Eucharis is a genus of about 15–20 species of neotropical plants in the Amaryllis family, native to Central America and South America, from Guatemala south to Bolivia. Some species have become naturalized in Mexico, the West Indies,  and scattered tropical islands. The English name Amazon lily is sometimes used for all species in the genus (as well as other genera), but is particularly used for Eucharis amazonica and Eucharis × grandiflora, which are often confused.

Description
Eucharis is a perennial with a bulb  in diameter. The flowers resemble narcissus flowers in having a prominent central cup, which is sometimes tinged with green. However, while in narcissus this cup is a corona, in Eucharis it is composed of widened and fused stamens.

Cultivation and uses
Eucharis amazonica and the hybrid Eucharis × grandiflora are the best-known and most generally cultivated species. It is propagated by removing the offsets, which may be done in spring, potting them singly in 15 cm pots. It requires good loamy soil, with enough sand to keep the compost open, and should have a good supply of water. A temperature of 18° to 20 °C during the night, and rising to 25 °C in the day. During summer growth is to be encouraged by repotting, but the plants should afterwards be slightly rested by removal to a night temperature of about 15 °C, water being withheld for a time, though they must not be left dry for too long, the plant being an evergreen. By the turn of the year they may again have more heat and more water, and this will probably induce them to flower. With a stock of the smaller plants to start them in succession, it is possible to have plants in flower all the year round. A hybrid has been raised between Eucharis and the allied genus Urceolina and given the hybrid name ×Urceocharis.

Species

Accepted species 
The following are species which are currently included within this genus.
 Eucharis amazonica Linden ex Planch. - Perú; naturalized in México, Venezuela, Central America, West Indies, Fiji, the Solomon Islands, Sri Lanka, Ascension Island, Society Islands
 Eucharis astrophiala (Ravenna) Ravenna - Ecuador
 Eucharis bakeriana N.E.Br. - San Martín Region of Perú
 Eucharis bonplandii (Kunth) Traub - Colombia
 Eucharis bouchei Woodson & P.Allen - Guatemala, Costa Rica, Panamá
 Eucharis candida Planch. & Linden - Colombia, Ecuador, Perú
 Eucharis castelnaeana (Baill.) J.F.Macbr. - Colombia (Amazonas), Peru (Loreto), Brazil (Amazonas)
 Eucharis caucana Meerow - Colombia
 Eucharis corynandra (Ravenna) Ravenna - Cajamarca Region of Perú
 Eucharis cyaneosperma Meerow - Bolivia (La Paz + Beni), Perú, Brazil (Amazonas + Acre)
 Eucharis formosa Meerow - Colombia, Ecuador, Perú
 Eucharis × grandiflora Planch. & Linden - Colombia, Ecuador
 †Eucharis lehmannii Regel - Cauca Department in Colombia but extinct
 Eucharis moorei (Baker) Meerow - Ecuador, Perú
 Eucharis oxyandra (Ravenna) Ravenna - Huánuco Region of Perú
 Eucharis plicata Meerow - Perú (San Martín), Bolivia (Beni)
 Eucharis sanderi Baker - Colombia
 Eucharis ulei Kraenzl. - Colombia (Amazonas), Perú, Bolivia (La Paz, Beni, Pando), Brazil (Amazonas + Acre)

Formerly Included 
Several plants that were once placed within the genus Eucharis have since been reclassified to other genera (Caliphruria, Mathieua and Plagiolirion).

See also

 List of plants known as lily

References

External links
 Bulbsociety
 Image of Eucharis in Pacific Bulb Society

 
Amaryllidaceae genera